Banana Custard or Bananas and Custard is a type of traditional pudding made from banana slices mixed with custard.

Preparation
Bananas are peeled and then sliced horizontally into thin slices and added to a bowl of custard, the custard is then heated until it is piping hot. The hot custard and banana slices are then served. Some versions are served with chilled custard.

See also
 Banana pudding
 List of custard desserts

References

Banana dishes
Custard desserts